San Pablo City Integrated High School (Filipino: Pambansang Mataas na Paaralan ng Lungsod ng San Pablo) is one of the 12 functioning public secondary schools of San Pablo City, Philippines. Located in F. Mariño St., Lakeside Park Subdivision, Brgy. VI-D, San Pablo City, it provides free secondary education for the people of the city and neighboring towns with a science curriculum. Abbreviated as SPCIHS, students nicknamed it "City High" or "City High Main".

History
In 1969, the late Councilor Jose C. Reyes filed a resolution for the establishment of a public high school. The school was founded on March 3, 1969, and was called "San Pablo City High School." In 1994. the status of the school changed from city to national as prescribed by Republic Act No. 6655 signed into law on May 26, 1988, by President Corazon Aquino. The name was changed to "San Pablo City National High School." In the 1990s, SPCNHS added annexes in different barangays of the city due to the unprecedented increase of enrollees that could no longer be accommodated in the school campus. Thus, it is now known as the "San Pablo City National High School-Main" In the 2000s, each annex became an independent public high school.

SPCNHS is recognized by the Department of Education.

School principals and heads
 Laila R. Maloles (2009 to August 2015)
 Roldan Acuin (2015 to 2017)
 Editha Fule(2017–2020)
 Lina Laguras(2021– Present)

Mathematics department head 
 Ryan L. Race

Science 
 Ma. Ruby Mendoza

Faculty and staff 

SPCNHS had 80 teachers as of February 12, 2009. They are grouped into 13 departments, each with a department head. There are 11 teachers under English, 11 under Mathematics, 16 under Science and Technology, 11 under Filipino, 9 under Araling Panlipunan, 9 under MAPEH, and 13 under T.L.E. In addition, 11 serve as administrative staff. All of these are headed by a secondary school principal.

External links
 
 http://msc.edu.ph/local_cyber2007/city%20high%20main/home.html

References

High schools in Laguna (province)
Schools in San Pablo, Laguna
1969 establishments in the Philippines
Educational institutions established in 1969